is a Japanese company headquartered in Kazo, Saitama, Japan, that specializes in manufacturing graphics tablets and related products.

Headquarters locations
The main headquarters are located in Kazo, Saitama, Japan. Its office in the USA  is currently located in the Pearl District of Portland, Oregon. The European headquarters is located in the Media Harbour in Dusseldorf, Germany.

History 
The company was founded in 1983 in Japan. The company released its first pen display in 1992 and was the first company to make pens without a cord.

Products 
Wacom produces two categories of graphics tablets: those with a screen ('pen display') and those without ('tablet'). In addition, the company provides software for computers and software to interpret pen data. Some pens have an eraser on the rear end.

Cintiq 

Wacom's professional pen displays are under the Cintiq line which allow for drawing directly on the screen like drawing on paper, which are more expensive than other Wacom products. The Cintiq Companion is a portable variant of the Cintiq displays.

Intuos 
Intuos graphics tablets are smaller tablets, without displays. The Verge calls them a "great introduction to digital art."

Other products 
In 2011, the company released a tablet-less pen, which allowed for drawing on any piece of paper, but was criticized for being inaccurate compared to a normal photo scan. The Wacom One, released at CES 2020, has a 13-inch, 1920x1080 display. The Verge labeled it as Wacom's "most affordable tablet to date," being priced at $400.

Wacoms other tablets, Bamboo, and Graphire, are both without screens.

Wacom partnered with Magic Leap to create collaborative mixed reality design tools, announced in 2018.

Technology
The pens use a movable tip to determine the pressure, and the tablets use patented electromagnetic resonance technology, a type of faint radio signal, called Electro Magnetic Resonance. This method does not require batteries in the pens.

Criticism 
Wacom has been criticized for their high cost of professional displays. The company has also received criticism for collection of user usage data, which Wacom says is "for quality assurance and development purposes," where the data is anonymized.

References

External links
 

Japanese companies established in 1983
Companies based in Portland, Oregon
Companies based in Saitama Prefecture
Companies listed on the Tokyo Stock Exchange
Computer companies established in 1983
Computer companies of Japan
Display technology companies
Japanese brands
Multinational companies headquartered in Japan